Luis Jose Rengifo (born February 26, 1997) is a Venezuelan professional baseball infielder for the Los Angeles Angels of Major League Baseball (MLB). He made his MLB debut in 2019.

Career

Seattle Mariners
Rengifo signed with the Seattle Mariners as an international free agent in March 2014. He made his professional debut that year with the Venezuelan Summer League Mariners, batting .198 with one home run and 20 runs batted in during in 64 games. He played 2015 with the Dominican Summer League Mariners where he slashed .336/.405/.465 with two home runs, 35 runs batted in, and 19 stolen bases in 60 games, 2016 with the Arizona League Mariners where he hit .239 in 34 games, and started 2017 with the Clinton LumberKings.

Tampa Bay Rays
On August 6, 2017, the Mariners traded Rengifo along with Anthony Misiewicz and a player to be named later (Osmy Gregorio), to the Tampa Bay Rays for Mike Marjama and Ryan Garton. He finished the season with the Bowling Green Hot Rods. In 125 games between Clinton and Bowling Green, he hit .250 with 12 home runs, 52 runs batted in, and 34 stolen bases.

Los Angeles Angels
On March 20, 2018, Rengifo was acquired by the Los Angeles Angels as the player to be named later from an earlier trade for C. J. Cron. He started the season with the Inland Empire 66ers and was promoted to the Mobile BayBears and Salt Lake Bees during the season. In 127 games between the three clubs, he slashed .299/.399/.452 with seven home runs, 64 runs batted in, 41 stolen bases, and 109 runs scored.

The Angels added Rengifo to their 40-man roster after the 2018 season. He began 2019 back with Salt Lake. On April 25, he was called up to the major league roster, and made his major league debut that night. He finished the season hitting .238 with seven home runs and 33 runs batted in during 108 games.

In early 2020, Rengifo was nearly traded to the Los Angeles Dodgers for Joc Pederson and Ross Stripling, but the trade fell through. Rengifo began the season as the Angels' second basemen but struggled and was sent down to the minors. He finished with a .156 batting average in 33 games.

On September 16, 2022, Rengifo recorded his first multi-home run game, in an 8–7 home victory over his former team, the Seattle Mariners. He went 3-for-5, hit a solo home run off of starter Robbie Ray as a right-handed batter, and hit a 3-run shot off reliever Matthew Festa as a left-handed batter.

In 2022 he batted .264/.294/.429. He walked in 3.3% of his plate appearances, the lowest percentage of all qualified major league batters. 15.8% of pitches thrown to him were curveballs, the highest such percentage in the majors.

Personal life
On September 16, 2021, it was reported that Rengifo had been charged by Venezuelan authorities with forging divorce documents and selling property without his ex-wife's consent. The incident allegedly happened in July 2019, with the documents being legalized in December 2020. Rengifo's father, sister and lawyer were arrested and detained that same day. An arrest warrant was issued for Rengifo, though it is unclear if extradition will be requested.

References

External links

1997 births
Living people
Arizona League Mariners players
Bowling Green Hot Rods players
Clinton LumberKings players
Dominican Summer League Mariners players
Inland Empire 66ers of San Bernardino players
Leones del Escogido players
Venezuelan expatriate baseball players in the Dominican Republic
Los Angeles Angels players
Major League Baseball infielders
Major League Baseball players from Venezuela
Mobile BayBears players
Navegantes del Magallanes players
People from Carabobo
Salt Lake Bees players
Venezuelan expatriate baseball players in the United States
Venezuelan Summer League Mariners players
2023 World Baseball Classic players